Brian Dobson  (13 September 1931 – 19 July 2012) was an English archaeologist, teacher and scholar. His specialisms were Hadrian's Wall and the Roman Army. He studied under Eric Birley and is a member of the so-called 'Durham School' of archaeology. He was a Reader Emeritus of Durham University.

Personal life
Dobson was born in Hartlepool in 1931 to a Plymouth Brethren family, attended school in Stockton before attending the University of Durham in 1949 to read Modern History as a member of Hatfield College. He fell under the influence of Eric Birley, who supervised his PhD on the role of primipilares in the Roman Army.

He was married for over 50 years and had five children.

Education and work
From 1955-57 he did his National Service in the army, learning Russian at Bodmin and Crail and serving in the Intelligence Corps. In 1957-59 he worked at the University of Birmingham as research fellow, there meeting and becoming influenced by the adult education tutor Graham Webster. In 1960 Dobson began working as a lecturer in archaeology in the Department of Extra Mural Studies, teaching in the adult education department - a post in which he remained until retirement in 1990. In this capacity Dobson organized a series of tours of Hadrian's Wall sites every four years in the 1960s. During these he introduced his students (and others) to many little-known (to the amateur) sites on the wall. He worked closely with David Breeze (chief inspector of ancient monuments for historic Scotland and visiting professor at Durham University since 1994) on their joint studies in aspects of Hadrian's Wall and produced one of the most influential texts on the subject, still in print today. He undertook a series of excavations in Corbridge in the 1960s and 1970s, and provided an eyewitness account of the discovery of the Corbridge Hoard.

Dobson served as president of the Society of Antiquaries of Newcastle and of the Architectural and Archaeological Society of Durham and Northumberland. He was also a member of several local trusts, including those of Chesters, Corbridge and Maryport museums. What gave him particular pleasure was his membership of the Vindolanda Trust from 1996 to 2011.

Hadrianic Society
In 1971, he founded the Hadrianic Society in order to promote the study of Hadrian's Wall and its environs. He remained the patron of the society from its conception until his death in 2012. To mark his 70th birthday, in 2002, the society presented him with a collation of papers from current and former students and colleagues. In 2017 the society published a Gedenkschrift in celebration of Dr. Dobson's career.

Publications
Birley, E., Dobson, B. and Jarret, M.G. (Eds.) 1994. Proceedings of the eighth International Congress of Limesforschung Cardiff: University of Wales Press
Breeze, D. and Dobson, B. 1993. Roman Officers and Frontiers. Stuttgart : Franz Steiner Verlag
Breeze, D. and Dobson, B. 2000. Hadrian's Wall " Penguin
Dobson, B. 1957. Die Rangordnung des römischen Heeres. Köln: Böhlau
Dobson, B. and Maxfield, V. 1995. Inscriptions of Roman Britain''. London: London Association of Classical Teachers

See also
Eric Birley
David Breeze

References

External links
Hadrianic Society
Hadrianic Society Blog

British archaeologists
Academics of Durham University
1931 births
2012 deaths
Fellows of the Society of Antiquaries of London
People from Hartlepool
Scholars of Hadrian's Wall
20th-century archaeologists
Alumni of Hatfield College, Durham